Anacrusis brunnorbis is a species of moth of the family Tortricidae. It is found in Ecuador.

The wingspan is about 26.5 mm. The ground colour of the forewings is pale brownish, tinged ferruginous medially and with brown along the costa. The strigulation (fine streaking) is blackish brown. The hindwings are dark brown.

Etymology
The species name refers to the presence of a terminal blotch on the forewing and is derived from Latin brunneus (meaning brown) and orbis (meaning circle).

References

Moths described in 2008
Atteriini
Moths of South America
Taxa named by Józef Razowski